Dekha Pyar Tumhara is a 1985 Indian Hindi-language film directed by Virendra Sharma. The film stars Kamal Haasan, Rati Agnihotri in leading roles. In 1996, the film was dubbed in Telugu and released with the title Allari Mogudu Anumanam Pellam.

Plot 

Anu, the beautiful daughter of a wealthy man loves Vishal and later marries him, but she is disappointed to experience that he is not a loving husband. Her friend Seema asks her to train her husband as a dog gets trained by his master. Anu reads the book and trains Vishal, ultimately making Vishal an hen-pecked husband. All goes very well as per Anu's plan for some time before Vishal finds same book and the trouble starts again, making Anu's life miserable, but they eventually make up their differences and live peacefully making each other happy.

Cast 
 Kamal Haasan as Vishal "Vishy"
 Rati Agnihotri as Anu
 Deven Verma as Lalu Lalwani
 Moushumi Chatterjee as Kiran Mallick
 Suresh Oberoi as Inspector Ranjeet Mallick
 Shakti Kapoor as himself / Ranjeet Mallick
 Om Shivpuri as Jaggu Kailashnath
 Iftekhar as Target's Managing Partner
 Yunus Parvez as Nadeem
 Usha Naik as Seema
 Kalpana Iyer as Rosy 
 Madhu Malhotra as Julie

Soundtrack

References

External links 
 

1980s Hindi-language films
1985 films
Films scored by Laxmikant–Pyarelal